Jovanka Smederevac is an Austrian world champion bridge player.

Bridge accomplishments

Wins
 World Team Olympiad (1) 1992
 European Transnationals Mixed Teams (1) 2013
 European Transnationals Women Pairs (1) 2013

References

External links
 
 

Austrian contract bridge players
Year of birth missing (living people)
Living people